The Nandi Award for Best Audiographer winners was commissioned since 1981:

References

Audiographer